Siegmund Lubin (born Zygmunt Lubszyński, April 20, 1851 – September 11, 1923) was an American motion picture pioneer who founded the Lubin Manufacturing Company (1902–1917) of Philadelphia.

Biography
Siegmund Lubin was born as Zygmunt Lubszyński, a son of Samuel Lubszyński and Rebeka Lubszyńska, Polish Jews, in Breslau, Germany (now Wrocław, Poland) or in Poznań on April 20, 1851. His father, a successful ophthalmologist, moved the family for economic reasons to Berlin soon after Zygmunt's birth. There young Zygmunt Germanicized the spelling of his first name to Siegmund.  He later graduated from the Heidelberg University and in 1876 emigrated to the United States, where he settled in Philadelphia and worked as an optometrist. Around 1881, he shortened his surname from the Polish Lubszyński to Lubin.

He soon progressed to making his own camera and projector combination, which he sold. In 1896 he began distributing films for Thomas Edison.  In 1897 he started making films and in 1902 formed the Lubin Manufacturing Company, incorporating it in 1909. He made the film Meet Me at the Fountain in 1904.  His company also sold illegally copied prints of many films by other directors, notably those of Georges Méliès, making Lubin one of the foremost early practitioners of film piracy.

By 1910 his company had built a film studio, "Lubinville", in Philadelphia, at Twentieth and Indiana Streets. A fire at its studio in June 1914 destroyed the negatives for his unreleased new films. When World War I broke out in Europe in September of that year, Lubin Studios was among the American filmmakers who lost foreign sales. The Lubin Film Company went out of business on September 1, 1917, after having made more than a thousand motion pictures. Siegmund went back to work as an optometrist.

He died on September 11, 1923 at his home in Ventnor, New Jersey. He was buried on September 14, 1923.

Legacy
For his contribution to the motion picture industry, Siegmund Lubin has a star on the Hollywood Walk of Fame (with his first name as "Sigmund") at 6166 Hollywood Blvd.

References

External links

 
The King of the Movies: Film Pioneer, Siegmund Lubin - biographical page with time line and other material by Joseph P. Eckhardt, Professor of History, Montgomery County Community College

WHYY, Ed Cunningham's Philadelphia, Siegmund Lubin, Video
Siegmund Lubin: King of the Movies, Betzwood, Digital History from the Libraries of Montgomery County Community College

1851 births
1923 deaths
American Jews
American people of Polish-Jewish descent
Cinema pioneers
American film studio executives
American film production company founders
Businesspeople from Philadelphia
People from Ventnor City, New Jersey
German emigrants to the United States
Lubin Manufacturing Company